Taffertia is an extinct genus of cephalopod belonging to the family Hildoceratidae. These cephalopods existed in the Jurassic period, during Toarcian age in the Falciferum zone and possibly only in Exaratum subzone. Its fossils were found in Canada, Morocco, Algeria and Italy

Description
Moderately involute, keeled, tectiform, sub-ogival shell with bold, regularly bifurcating ribs. It is similar to Pseudolioceras, but is more evolute and differs from other Harpoceratinae by having bifurcating ribs.

References

Hildoceratidae
Ammonitida genera
Toarcian life
Early Jurassic ammonites of Europe
Ammonites of Europe
Ammonites of North America